is a former Japanese football player.

Playing career
Hara was born in Meguro, Tokyo on April 19, 1981. After graduating from high school, he joined J1 League club Nagoya Grampus Eight in 2000. He played many matches as substitute forward until 2003. In 2004, he moved to J2 League club Kyoto Purple Sanga. However he could not play many matches. In 2005, he moved to J2 club Montedio Yamagata. He played as regular player and scored many goals in 2005. However he played many matches as substitute forward in 2006 and was released from the club at the end of the 2006 season. In 2007, he moved to J2 club Shonan Bellmare. He played many matches until 2008. However his opportunity to play decreased in 2009 and he retired at the end of the 2009 season.

Club statistics

References

External links

1981 births
Living people
Association football people from Tokyo
Japanese footballers
J1 League players
J2 League players
Nagoya Grampus players
Kyoto Sanga FC players
Montedio Yamagata players
Shonan Bellmare players
Association football forwards